Francois Drummer (30 September 1938 – 3 August 2015) was a South African cricketer. He played first-class cricket for Transvaal and Western Province.

References

External links
 

1938 births
2015 deaths
South African cricketers
Gauteng cricketers
Western Province cricketers
Cricketers from Cape Town